Johnatan Dwayne (born July 31, 1963) is a musician, composer, and artist who introduced the musical concept of art rock into Puerto Rico.

Early years
Dwayne was born in San Juan, Puerto Rico the capital city of the island. In the 1980s he belonged to the musical group Words Four Two, singing lead and composing. The dominating musical styles in Puerto Rico at this time were Salsa and Merengue, but the group's release of "Somethin' in the Air" was a hit, and made Art Rock a competing style; this song was followed by "Society Killed by Who".

In 1991, after the group broke up, Dwayne composed for others, creating the Spanish version of "Pocket" for Ednita Nazario, and "Metamorfosis". His first gold record as composer was for "Un Corazon Hecho Pedazos" (meaning "A Heart Broken to Pieces"). He won the Tu Musica Award and also an award from Billboard and ASCAP.  Nazario's recording of his "Pasiones" ("Passions") went platinum.  Commissions followed from additional Puerto Rican singers, including Lunna and Jailene Cintrón.  Dwayne won the Silver Ermita award, in Colombia, as a vocal soloist. Two of Dwayne's works as a painter, Personajes and Ser es des Nudos, have been exhibited in various expositions.

Acting career
In 2000, he made his debut as actor in the soap opera Hombres de Honor (Men of Honor). He has participated in over 20 soap operas so far. In 2004, he made his American stage debut in Washington, D.C., as Don Luis in Pedro Calderón de la Barca's La Dama Duende ("The Elf Lady"). One of the outfits worn by Dwayne during his days as a member of the group Word Four Two is currently on display at the Hard Rock Cafe in Old San Juan.

See also

List of Puerto Ricans
List of Puerto Rican songwriters

References

External links
Popular Culture

1963 births
Living people
Male actors from San Juan, Puerto Rico
Musicians from San Juan, Puerto Rico
20th-century Puerto Rican male singers
Puerto Rican painters
Puerto Rican singer-songwriters
Puerto Rican male stage actors
Puerto Rican male soap opera actors
Puerto Rican male composers
American male singer-songwriters